Eidsvåg Idrettslag is a Norwegian football club from Eidsvåg, Åsane, Bergen.

The club was founded on 26 October 1924. The men's football team currently resides in the Fifth Division (sixth tier). It last played in the Third Division in 1992.

References

Official site

Football clubs in Norway
Association football clubs established in 1924
Sport in Bergen
Defunct athletics clubs in Norway
1924 establishments in Norway